One Hour in Wonderland is a 1950 television special made by Walt Disney Productions. It was first seen on Christmas Day, 1950, over NBC (4–5 pm in all time zones) for Coca-Cola, and was Walt Disney's first television production. It featured Disney as host, with Bobby Driscoll, Kathryn Beaumont, Edgar Bergen & Charlie McCarthy (who appeared on radio for Coke), and other celebrities who worked with Disney, including the Firehouse Five Plus Two jazz band. This special was actually a promotional program for Disney's upcoming theatrical feature, Alice in Wonderland. Kathryn Beaumont, who voiced Alice, was dressed like her for this television special.

This television special was included as a bonus feature on the Masterpiece and Un-Anniversary DVD editions of Alice in Wonderland, as well as the 2011 Blu-ray release and the Exclusive Archive Collection laserdisc box set release.

Synopsis 
Edgar Bergen informs Charlie McCarthy and Mortimer Snerd that Walt Disney has invited them to a tea party. Charlie is hesitant to go, but reluctantly changes his mind when he learns Kathryn Beaumont will be there. While driving to the studio, Edgar tells the story of Alice in Wonderland, much to Charlie's dismay. When they arrive, Walt Disney tells everyone that he was able to buy the Magic Mirror from Snow White (who apparently got it from the Wicked Queen). Charlie insults the mirror, calling it a "hopped-up television set." This enrages the mirror but Walt calms him down. The Mirror then shows everybody what they wish to see. He shows Kathryn a scene from Snow White and the Seven Dwarfs, Charlie the Mickey Mouse short Clock Cleaners (although Charlie wanted to see himself), Bobby Driscoll a Br'er Rabbit story, Mortimer a Pluto short, and Edgar, Disney's animation studios. There, the cartoonists (played by Firehouse Five Plus Two) take advantage of Walt's absence to have fun playing jingle bells instead of working. At the end of the song, they realize Walt is watching, and frantically finish a scene with Tweedledee and Tweedledum. The Mirror at first refuses to show the unfinished Alice in Wonderland, but changes his mind when everyone wants to see it. The Mirror then reluctantly shows a scene from the film. At the end of the special, Edgar has acquired the Magic Mirror. Charlie tries to make a deal with the mirror, but it turns out Mortimer is the new slave of the magic mirror. Charlie changes his mind and goes to sleep.

Segments 
 Seven Dwarves' Party for Snow White (Snow White and the Seven Dwarfs) - 1937
 Clock Cleaners (Mickey Mouse) - 1937
 Br'er Rabbit Runs Away (Song of the South) - 1946
 Bone Trouble (Pluto) - 1940
 Jingle Bells (made for the special) - performed by Firehouse Five Plus Two
 The Mad Tea Party (Alice in Wonderland) - 1950/1951

Cast 
 Walt Disney as himself and Mickey Mouse (voice)
 Kathryn Beaumont as herself and Alice
 Bobby Driscoll as himself
 Edgar Bergen as himself, Charlie McCarthy, and Mortimer Snerd
 Hans Conried as Magic Mirror (it was voiced by Moroni Olsen in the animated film)
 Adriana Caselotti as Snow White (voice)
 Roy Atwell as Doc (voice)
 Otis Harlan as Happy (voice)
 Pinto Colvig as Sleepy, Grumpy, Goofy, and Pluto (voice)
 Scotty Mattraw as Bashful (voice)
 Billy Gilbert as Sneezy (voice)
 Clarence Nash as Donald Duck (voice)
 James Baskett as Uncle Remus and Br'er Fox (voice)
 Johnny Lee as Br'er Rabbit (voice)
 Nick Stewart as Br'er Bear (voice)
 Ed Wynn as Mad Hatter (voice)
 Jerry Colonna as March Hare (voice)
 Jimmy MacDonald as Dormouse (voice)
 Bill Thompson as White Rabbit (voice)
 Firehouse Five Plus Two as themselves
 Diane Marie Disney as herself
 Sharon Mae Disney as herself

References

External links
 
 

1950 television specials
American television specials
Black-and-white American television shows
Disney television specials
NBC television specials
Alice in Wonderland (franchise)